Greatest Hits is a compilation album by English rock band Mott the Hoople. It was released on 1 March 1976 through Columbia Records.

Release and reception

Dave Thompson of AllMusic wrote,

Track listing 

 Sides one and two were combined as tracks 1–10 on CD reissues.

Personnel 

Mott the Hoople 
 Ian Hunter – piano, acoustic guitar, vocals 
 Overend Watts – bass guitar, rhythm guitar, vocals
 Dale Griffin – drums, vocals
 Morgan Fisher – piano, synthesizer 
 Mick Ralphs – electric guitar, rhythm guitar, organ 
 Ariel Bender – electric guitar

Additional musicians 
 David Bowie – producer on "All the Young Dudes"
 Mick Ronson – electric guitar 
 Thunderthighs – backing vocals 
 Sue & Sunny – backing vocals 

Design
 Norman Seeff – photography
 Norman Moore – sleeve design

References 

1976 greatest hits albums
Mott the Hoople albums